In Maya mythology, Tzacol or Tzakol was a sky god and one of the creator deities who participated in the last two attempts at creating humanity.

Maya gods
Creator gods
Sky and weather gods

es:Tzacol